Tarun Kanti Mishra (born 2 August 1950) is an Indian Odia story writer. More than 15 of his books have been published. He got Central Sahitya Akademi Award, Odisha Sahitya Academy award and Sarala Award for his contribution in literature and was an IAS in profession and retired after being head of the administration department of Odisha. Then he also worked as Chief Information Commissioner of Odisha.

Life 
Tarun Kanti was born in 1950, in Kendujhar district. He did his schooling in Puri Zilla School and P.M. Academy, Cuttack. He completed graduation from Buxi Jagabandhu Bidyadhar College in Economics and post graduation in Applied Economics from Utkal University. He also holds an MA degree from the University of East Anglia, UK.

He wished to become a teacher, but joined administrative service to meet family expectations. He joined Indian Administrative Service in 1975. After being in administrative positions in various Government of Odisha departments, he became head of the state administration in August 2009. He retired in August 2010. Government of Odisha appointed him as State Information Commissioner in November 2010. He relinquished this office in 2015.

Literature life 
Tarun Kanti Mishra's first story Hey Pruthibira Naagarika was published in the reputed literary magazine Aasantaakaali at the age of fourteen. His first anthology of short stories was published in 1968 while studying BJB College, Bhubaneswar. He has published18 anthologies and one novel. Many of his works have been translated into Hindi, Bengali, Urdu, Telugu, Malayalam, Marathi, Gujarati, and English. He authored a novel against the backdrop of Dandakaranya, a vast territory inhabited by immigrants of erstwhile East Pakistan and a large tribal population.

Works 
 Aabrtara Duiti Swara
 Nisangatara Swara
 Komala Gandhaara
 Bahubrihi
 Paaraadise Pakhi
 Jane Nirastra Attatayi
 Bitansa
 Prajaapatira Denaa Naahi
 Aakasha Setu
 Lubdhakara Raati
 Aji Ratir Galpa
 Bhaswati
 Kehi Jane Eka Eka
 Ajana tithi ra janha

Honours and awards
 Kendra Sahitya Akademi Award, 2019
 Odisha Sahitya Academy Award - 1997
 Sarala Award 2001.
 Katha Award, New Delhi.
 Think Orissa Leadership Award - 2009
 D.Litt. (North Odisha University)

References

1950 births
Living people
Alumni of the University of East Anglia
Novelists from Odisha
People from Kendujhar district
Recipients of the Sahitya Akademi Award in Odia
Odia-language writers
Odia novelists
Odia short story writers
Indian Hindus
20th-century Indian novelists
20th-century Indian short story writers